The terpenoids, also known as isoprenoids, are a class of naturally occurring organic chemicals derived from the 5-carbon compound isoprene and its derivatives called terpenes, diterpenes, etc.  While sometimes used interchangeably with "terpenes", terpenoids contain additional functional groups, usually containing oxygen. When combined with the hydrocarbon terpenes, terpenoids comprise about 80,000 compounds. They are the largest class of plant secondary metabolites, representing about 60% of known natural products.  Many terpenoids have substantial pharmacological bioactivity and are therefore of interest to medicinal chemists.

Plant terpenoids are used for their aromatic qualities and play a role in traditional herbal remedies. Terpenoids contribute to the scent of eucalyptus, the flavors of cinnamon, cloves, and ginger, the yellow color in sunflowers, and the red color in tomatoes. Well-known terpenoids include citral, menthol, camphor, salvinorin A in the plant Salvia divinorum, ginkgolide and bilobalide found in Ginkgo biloba and the cannabinoids found in cannabis. The provitamin beta carotene is a terpene derivative called a carotenoid.

The steroids and sterols in animals are biologically produced from terpenoid precursors. Sometimes terpenoids are added to proteins, e.g., to enhance their attachment to the cell membrane; this is known as isoprenylation. Terpenoids play a role in plant defence as prophylaxis against pathogens and attractants for the predators of herbivores.

Structure and classification
Terpenoids are modified terpenes, wherein methyl groups have been moved or removed, or oxygen atoms added. Some authors use the term "terpene" more broadly, to include the terpenoids. Just like terpenes, the terpenoids can be classified according to the number of isoprene units that comprise the parent terpene:

Terpenoids can also be classified according to the type and number of cyclic structures they contain: linear, acyclic, monocyclic, bicyclic, tricyclic, tetracyclic, pentacyclic, or macrocyclic. The Salkowski test can be used to identify the presence of terpenoids.

Biosynthesis

Terpenoids, at least those containing an alcohol functional group, often arise by hydrolysis of carbocationic intermediates produced from geranyl pyrophosphate.  Analogously hydrolysis of intermediates from farnesyl pyrophosphate gives sesquiterpenoids, and hydrolysis of intermediates from geranylgeranyl pyrophosphate gives diterpenoids, etc.

See also 
 List of antioxidants in food
 List of phytochemicals in food
 Nutrition
 Phytochemistry
 Secondary metabolites

References

External links 
IUPAC definition of terpenoids

 
Plant communication

cs:Izoprenoidy
es:Terpenoides
it:Terpeni